"Oh Jackie" by Tiffany from her second album Hold an Old Friend's Hand was only released in Japan in May 1989. At the same time Yamaha launched a full-scale media campaign featuring Tiffany and this song in order to promote their new line of stereo systems, named after her (the "Tiffany System Stereo" - as marked on this single cover) which pioneered "Active Servo Technology".

Other territories received the singles "Hold an Old Friend's Hand" and "It's the Lover (Not the Love)" within a similar time period, but neither performed well due to declining popularity in the west.

Track listings and formats
7" single and 3" CD single

 "Oh Jackie" 
 "I'll Be the Girl"

References

Tiffany Darwish songs
1988 songs
1989 singles
Songs written by Tim James (musician)
Songs written by Steven McClintock
MCA Records singles